The Rutgers Scarlet Knights women's basketball team is the intercollegiate women's basketball program representing Rutgers University–New Brunswick. The school competes in the Big Ten Conference in Division I of the National Collegiate Athletic Association (NCAA). The Scarlet Knights play home basketball games at the Louis Brown Athletic Center on the university campus in Piscataway, New Jersey.

History
The Scarlet Knights began play in 1974, winning their first ever game against Princeton 76–60. In 1976, Theresa Shank Grentz was hired as head coach, becoming the first full-time female basketball coach. The Scarlet Knights won the AIAW National Tournament 83–77 over Texas at the Palestra with the help of Restrepo-Pinero, who scored 30 points while being named MVP. In 2007, C. Vivian Stringer became the first coach to ever lead three teams (including Rutgers) to the Final Four.

Retired Numbers

All-Time Statistical Leaders

Career leaders
Points scored: 2,655 (Sue Wicks – 1984–88)
Assists: 839 (Tasha Pointer – 1997-01)
Rebounds: 1,357 (Sue Wicks – 1984–88)
Steals: 294 (Cappie Pondexter – 2002–06)
Blocks: 332 (Rachel Hollivay – 2012–2016)

Single season leaders
Points scored: 793 (Sue Wicks- 1987–88)
Assists: 257 (Tasha Pointer – 2000–01)
Rebounds: 404 (Sue Wicks – 1986–87)
Steals: 117 (Liz Hanson – 1993–94)
Blocks: 127 (Rachel Hollivay  – 2013–14)

Single game leaders
Points scored: (44 by Sue Wicks  vs George Washington −12/05/1987)
Assists: (18 by Tasha Pointer vs Stephen F. Austin – 03/17/2001)
Rebounds: (26 by Sandy Tupurins vs William Paterson – 03/01/1977)
Steals: (10 by Syessence Davis vs  Penn State – 01/10/2015 & 10 by Denise Kenney vs Saint Joseph’s – 02/16/1978)
Blocks: (11 by Sue Wicks vs West Virginia – 01/03/1987)

Awards and honors
Naismith/U.S. Basketball Writers Association/Women’s Basketball News Service/Street & Smith’s National Player of the Year – Sue Wicks, 1988 winner.
Big East Conference Coach of the Year – C. Vivian Stringer, 1998 & 2005.
Atlantic-10 Conference Coach of the Year – Theresa Grentz, 1986, 1988 (co), 1993, & 1994.

International
Mael Gilles : 2017 Summer Universiade

Coaching history
As of the end of the 2021–22 season, the Knights have had four head coaches and two interim coaches.  

† Denotes combined conference record (202–94 record with the Big East Conference, 12–6 record with the American Athletic Conference, and 19–15 record with the Big Ten Conference)

Postseason results

NCAA Division I

AIAW Division I
The Scarlet Knights made four appearances in the AIAW National Division I basketball tournament, with a combined record of 7–4.

References

External links